ION Satellite Carrier (formerly ION CubeSat Carrier) is a satellite platform developed, manufactured, and operated by Italian company D-Orbit. The platform features a customizable 64U satellite dispenser capable of hosting a combination of CubeSats that fits the volume. Throughout a mission, ION Satellite Carrier can release the hosted satellites individually, changing orbital parameter between one deployment and the next. Each of the miniature CubeSats weighs a few kilograms.  

The organization also developed a D3 (D-Orbit Decommissioning Device) system, which has obtained funding from the European Commission and the European Space Agency, to safely dispose of satellites at the end of their lives and avoid adding to the problems created by the approximately 130 million pieces of space debris. According to D-Orbit, a space circular economy is feasible, and space recycling will soon be a new sector. This will involve using local resources such as dead satellites to create spaceships in space.

The inaugural mission, named Origin, was launched on Vega flight VV16 from the Guiana Space Centre in French Guiana on September 3, 2020. The vehicle, named ION SCV Lucas, carried 12 SuperDove satellites from Planet_Labs. On September 25th, ION SCV Lucas released successfully the first SuperDove satellite of the batch; the last satellite was deployed on October 28th. As of November 2022, ION SCV has successfully completed 6 missions, 1 as a payload of a Vega rocket and 5 as a payload of a Falcon 9 Block 5 rocket.

D-Orbit is a successful alumnus of the European Space Agency's incubator, ESA BIC Portugal, and the two firms collaborated on Project Sunrise, an active debris removal project, in 2019.

Mission overview 
The carrier deployed CubeSats one by one using a spring release mechanism once positioned in a sun-synchronous orbit at 500 km. The 60 cm cubic dispenser allows for several combinations of 1U, 2U, 3U, 3U+, 6U, 6U+, 12U and 12U+ Cubesats along the vertical axis. After completion of the up to one month long deployment phase, ION CubeSat Carrier will initiate a validation phase of its payloads directly integrated on the platform.

Missions

Past missions

Planned missions

See also
NanoRacks CubeSat Deployer
Vigoride
SHERPA
Orbiter

References

External links
InOrbit NOW
D-Orbit

Spacecraft launched in 2020
Spacecraft launched in 2021
Spacecraft launched in 2022
Spacecraft launched in 2023
Satellite dispensers